Tom Jones Tikolo (born 24 October 1961) is a former Kenyan cricketer. He captained Kenya in 22 ICC Trophy games, more than anyone else. Despite that, he only played in one first class match, although he did well, scoring 79 in one innings. After ending his playing career, Tikolo became the development officer for East Africa. In 2005, he was named as the new CEO of Cricket Kenya and also as a national selector. Tikolo is the brother of cricketers David and Steve Tikolo.

References

External links

1961 births
Living people
Kenyan cricketers
Kenyan cricket administrators
Coaches of the Uganda national cricket team
Kenyan expatriate sportspeople in Uganda
Kenyan cricket coaches
Kenyan cricket captains
People from Kakamega